Buttar is a clan as well as surname of Jat people in the Punjab.

Buttar may also refer to:

Surname 
Rashid Buttar, a holistic doctor based in North Carolina
Amna Buttar, a doctor and member of Provincial Assembly of Punjab, Pakistan
 Muhammad Javed Buttar, a former justice of Supreme court of Pakistan
 Chris Buttars, a former Republican member of the Utah State Senate

Places 

 Aasa Buttar, a village in Sri Muktsar Sahib district, Punjab
 Buttar Bakhuha, a village in Sri Muktsar Sahib district, Punjab
 Buttar Kalan, Gurdaspur, a village in Gurdaspur district
 Buttar Kalan, Moga, a village in Moga district, Punjab
 Buttar Sarinh, a village of Buttar Jatts in Sri Muktsar Sahib district, Punjab
 Buttar Sivia, a village in Amritsar district, Punjab
 Buttran, Punjab, a village in Jalandhar district, Punjab
 Gehri Buttar, a village of Buttars in Bathinda district, Punjab
 Kokri Buttran, a village of Buttars in Moga district, Punjab

See also 

 Butter (disambiguation)
 Butters (disambiguation)